Newte is a surname. Notable people with the surname include: 

Henry Newte (1609–1670), English politician
Horace Newte (1870–1949), English playwright, author, and journalist
John Newte (1656–1716), Anglican cleric
Richard Newte (1613–1678), Anglican cleric

See also
Newt (name)